Margaret Mee and the Moonflower is a 2012 Brazilian documentary film directed by Malu De Martino, about the work and legacy of British botanical artist Margaret Mee, who moved to Brazil in the 1950s, produced over 400 illustrations about Brazilian flora and, used her art as a tool to defend the environmentalism.

References

External links
  
 

Brazilian documentary films
2012 documentary films
2012 films
Documentary films about visual artists
Botanical art
2010s Portuguese-language films